Colin Herbert (born 19 March 1992) is a South African professional rugby union player who last played for the  in the Currie Cup. His regular position is inside centre, but he can also play as a fly-half.

Career

Youth

Herbert represented the Griffons Under-18 side at the 2010 Academy Week tournament. In the same season, he also made five appearances for the s in the 2010 Under-19 Provincial Championship. In 2011, he made the step up to the  squad, scoring 32 points for them in five appearances in the 2011 Under-21 Provincial Championship, the top scorer for his side.

Griffons

He made four more appearances and kicked one conversion as the Griffons finish sixth in the Northern Section of the tournament.

Herbert made one start and one substitute appearance in the 2014 Vodacom Cup as the Griffons matched their 2013 result by finishing sixth, before making three appearances in the 2014 Currie Cup qualification series, a tournament which was introduced to determine the final team to play in the 2014 Currie Cup Premier Division. Herbert scored his first points in the Currie Cup series during this competition, kicking nine points during the season, but the Griffons lost out on a spot in the Premier Division by finishing third to progress to the 2014 Currie Cup First Division. Herbert played in two matches in the First Division, which saw the Griffons finish in second spot on the log.

Herbert featured in six of the Griffons' matches during the 2015 Vodacom Cup, with his side once again finishing in sixth spot in the Northern Section.

Personal

References

1992 births
Living people
Griffons (rugby union) players
Rugby union centres
Rugby union fly-halves
Rugby union players from Welkom
South African rugby union players